Frances Hargreaves (6 January 1955 – 3 March 2017) was an Australian actress, who became famous in the 1970s through her long-running role of Marilyn McDonald in soap opera Number 96.

Biography
Hargreaves was born in South Africa, of British descent and prior to Number 96 she had studied in London, and began acting on the stage in the UK. After marrying Australian actor and singer David Gilchrist, they settled in Australia in 1973. Their daughter Amelia was born in 1989.

In January 1974, Hargreaves scored the role of rebellious Marilyn McDonald at the last-minute when the original actress, Judy McBurney, had to withdraw due to peritonitis after only six episodes. Hargreaves had to re-shoot all of McBurney's scenes.

Marilyn was the adopted daughter of Edie and Reg (Mike Dorsey and Wendy Blacklock), whom she always called "Mummy and Daddy". Marilyn was primarily a comedy character, but her most dramatic storyline was when she discovered the identity of the infamous Number 96 pantyhose strangler.

Hargreaves left the series in June 1975 when she fell pregnant. During a subsequent visit to her native South Africa with newborn son Samuel David, she acted in theatre productions of The Sound of Music and Stop the World I Want to Get Off.

She subsequently returned to Australia and resumed her role in Number 96 from April 1977 until its demise later that year. She later appeared in The Young Doctors as Emma Dixon in 1979 and Who Killed Baby Azaria? (1984).

In 2007 Hargreaves appeared in Where Are They Now? with fellow Number 96 cast members for a reunion special.

Frances Hargreaves died in Sydney on 3 March 2017, aged 62, after a long illness.

References

External links

1955 births
2017 deaths
Australian soap opera actresses
20th-century Australian actresses
South African actresses
South African expatriates in the United Kingdom
South African emigrants to Australia
South African people of British descent
21st-century Australian women
21st-century Australian people